Vath Chamroeun  (born 12 October 1972) is a Cambodian wrestler. He competed in the men's freestyle 62 kg at the 1996 Summer Olympics.

References

External links

1972 births
Living people
Cambodian male sport wrestlers
Olympic wrestlers of Cambodia
Wrestlers at the 1996 Summer Olympics
Place of birth missing (living people)